Semenoff is a surname. Notable people with the surname include:

Gordon Walter Semenoff (born 1953), Canadian theoretical physicist 
Grigory Semenoff (1890–1946), Japanese-supported leader of the White movement in Transbaikal

See also
Semyonov (disambiguation)